Moss is the second studio album by American singer-songwriter and actress Maya Hawke, released on September 23, 2022. It is the follow-up to her positively received debut album Blush (2020).

Background 
On June 29, 2022, Hawke announced Moss alongside the release of the first single "Thérèse". "Thérèse" was inspired by a Balthus painting at the Metropolitan Museum of Art called "Thérèse Dreaming". Hawke has identified with the girl in the "Thérèse Dreaming" painting "who in my head is me" in the track. Hawke cited Taylor Swift's album Folklore (2020) as an inspiration for the sound of Moss.

According to a press release from Mom + Pop, Moss serves as "Hawke's meditation on rebirth and acceptance".

Release 
Moss was released on September 23, 2022, as a digital download, for streaming, and on CD and vinyl LP formats. An exclusive release of Moss was also available from Urban Outfitters as a translucent pink vinyl LP. A translucent orange LP is available from Maya Hawke's official website.

Critical reception 

In a four star review, Rhian Daly of NME wrote that Moss is "fresh" and "presents Hawke in wiser form" both lyrically and sonically from her debut album Blush. A review in The Forty-Five called the album was a "more confident and experimental departure" from Blush, praising Hawke’s intimate vocal performance. Vicky Greer of The Line of Best Fit identified "Thérèse" and "Bloomed Into Blue" as some of the best songs on the album, which she called a "gorgeous outing for Maya Hawke".

Track listing

Charts

References 

2022 albums
Mom + Pop Music artists
Maya Hawke albums